Thomas Endres (born 12 September 1969) is a German fencer. He won a silver medal in the team foil event at the 1988 Summer Olympics.

References

External links
 

1969 births
Living people
German male fencers
Olympic fencers of West Germany
Fencers at the 1988 Summer Olympics
Olympic silver medalists for West Germany
Olympic medalists in fencing
Sportspeople from Würzburg
Medalists at the 1988 Summer Olympics